German submarine U-4 was a Type IIA U-boat of Nazi Germany's Kriegsmarine before and during World War II. She was one of the longest lasting German submarines of the period, primarily since half of her time was spent on training duties in the Baltic Sea.

Commissioned on 17 August 1935, she was one of the first batch of Type IIA boats constructed following the Anglo-German Naval Agreement that repealed the terms of the Treaty of Versailles which ended the First World War and stated that Germany was not permitted to possess submarines. Built at the Deutsche Werke in Kiel as yard number 239, she was a highly sought after command before the outbreak of the Second World War in 1939. Once the war had begun however, she rapidly became obsolete. Before she was superseded, she carried out four combat patrols, mainly in support of the Norwegian campaign.

Design
U-4 had a displacement of  when at the surface and  while submerged. She had two shafts and two  propellers.

U-4 was fitted with three  torpedo tubes at the bow, five torpedoes or up to twelve Type A torpedo mines, and a  anti-aircraft gun. The boat had a complement of 25.

War patrols

First and second patrols
U-4 departed Wilhelmshaven for her first patrol on 4 September 1939, in the aftermath of the declaration of war. Given her small size, she only covered the area to the south of Norway and into the North Sea west of Denmark and along the Dutch coast, and returned unsuccessful on 14 September. A second patrol later in the month yielded greater dividends, when she spotted three neutral vessels heading to Britain through the North Sea and sank them on consecutive days; the Martti Ragnar on the 22nd, the Walma on the 23rd and the Gertrud Bratt on the 24th.

Third and fourth patrols
Her later two patrols were both in support of the German invasion of Norway. It was during this operation that she was able to sink the British submarine . The engagement was a lengthy one, as U-4 was a small coastal craft with poor endurance. When Thistle attacked and missed U-4 on 9 April, it gave the German submarine a chance to evade and hunt her attacker, finally catching and sinking the British vessel as she recharged her batteries on the surface a day later.

The Baltic
Once Norway was subdued, it became increasingly obvious that U-4 and her sisters were not capable of either outfighting or outrunning enemy craft, neither did they possess the range and endurance necessary to have a major impact on Allied shipping. In response, on 1 July 1940, these boats were relegated to the 21st U-boat Flotilla, and served until 1944 as training craft in the Baltic Sea. Although some of her sisters saw action later against the Soviets, U-4 did not, eventually being retired from all service at Gotenhafen (now known as Gdynia in Poland), on 1 August 1944, and then scrapped for parts sometime in 1945.

Summary of raiding history

References

Notes

Citations

Bibliography

External links

German Type II submarines
U-boats commissioned in 1935
World War II submarines of Germany
1935 ships
Ships built in Kiel